The Nature Coast is an informal, unofficial region of the U.S. state of Florida. The broadest definition of the Nature Coast includes the eight counties that abut the Gulf of Mexico along the Big Bend Coast defined by geologists: from west to east, Wakulla, Jefferson, Taylor, Dixie, Levy, Citrus, Hernando, and Pasco counties. (Note that the Big Bend Coast differs from the Big Bend region of Florida.)

Many businesses and organizations incorporate "Nature Coast" in their names, but most of them do not explicitly define the region, or define a smaller region. For instance, the Nature Coast State Trail, which is officially designated as part of Florida’s Statewide System of Greenways and Trails, is located in Dixie, Gilchrist and Levy counties. The Nature Coaster website covers only Citrus, Hernando and Pasco counties.

This region of Florida is culturally partially southern, with the Deep South culture extending to Levy County. The lower southern end (Pasco, Hernando, and Citrus County) are often considered part of the Tampa Bay Area.

The name "Nature Coast" was devised in 1991 as part of a marketing campaign to attract vacationers to the eight county area. The name eventually began to be used locally, and describes the area formally known as the "Big Bend" of Florida.

Activities common in this area include hunting, fishing, boating, bird watching and nature hiking. Snorkeling spots are found in the rivers along the Nature Coast. Diving and manatee tours are available, predominantly in areas such as Crystal River, Homosassa and Homosassa Springs.

The Nature Coast is home to wildlife including deer, wild pigs, roseate spoonbills, alligators, raccoons, opossums, snakes, great blue herons, egrets, turtles and at least 19 endangered species.

There are also 50 golf courses in the area.

Attractions

Citrus
Chassahowitzka National Wildlife Refuge, partly in Hernando County
Crystal River Archaeological State Park
Crystal River National Wildlife Refuge
Crystal River Preserve State Park
Homosassa Springs Wildlife State Park
Lake Rousseau
Withlacoochee State Trail
Yulee Sugar Mill Ruins State Historic Site

Hernando
The Heritage Museum
Weeki Wachee Springs

Jefferson
Letchworth Mounds

Levy
Cedar Key Museum State Park
Cedar Key Scrub State Reserve
Cedar Keys National Wildlife Refuge
Fanning Springs State Park
Manatee Springs State Park
Waccasassa Bay Preserve State Park
Goethe State Forest

Marion
Rainbow Springs State Park
Silver Springs State Park

Pasco
Pioneer Florida Museum and Village
Starkey Wilderness Preserve
Werner-Boyce Salt Springs State Park
Conner Preserve

Taylor
Forest Capital Museum State Park

Wakulla
Bradwell Bay Wilderness
Edward Ball Wakulla Springs State Park
Ochlockonee River State Park
San Marcos de Apalache Historic State Park
St. Marks National Wildlife Refuge
Tallahassee-St. Marks Historic Railroad Trail State Park

See also

 Florida Suncoast - to the south
 Forgotten Coast - to the north and west

References

External links
 Nature Coast Coalition List of attractions and events
Florida's Nature Coast Conservancy

Regions of Florida
Central Florida
North Florida
Coasts of Florida